State Route 336 (SR 336) is a 19.6 mile long north-south state highway in central Blount County, Tennessee.

Route description

SR 336 begins at an intersection with US 411 (SR 33) just east of Greenback. It travels south through farmland as Brick Mill Road to the community of Lanier, where it has an intersection with US 129 (Calderwood Highway/SR 115). The highway turns northeast through hilly and wooded terrain as 6 Mile Road to the community of Six Mile, where it makes a sharp left at an intersection with Montvale Road and Old Piney Road. SR 336 goes north to pass through a ridge as Montvale Road before passing through farmland and suburbs to enter Maryville. It passes through neighborhoods before coming to an end at an intersection with US 321 (W Lamar Alexander Parkway/SR 73).

Major intersections

References

336
Transportation in Blount County, Tennessee
Maryville, Tennessee